Henry Cecil Kennedy Wyld (27 March 1870–26 January 1945) was a notable English lexicographer and philologist.

Early life
Wyld was born in 1870 and attended Charterhouse School from 1883 to 1885; he was then privately educated in Lausanne from 1885 to 1888. He studied at the University of Bonn, the University of Heidelberg and Corpus Christi College, Oxford.

Academic career
From 1904 to 1920, Wyld was Baines Professor of English Language and Philology at the University of Liverpool. He was Merton Professor of English Language and Literature at the University of Oxford and a fellow of Merton College, Oxford, from 1920 until his death in 1945.

Publications
Wyld was the author of many papers and books during his career. His Universal Dictionary of the English Language was published in 1932.

Honours
Wyld was awarded the British Academy Biennial Prize for contributions to the study of the English Language and Literature in 1932.

Quotations
 No gentleman goes on a bus

Selected bibliography
1908: The Teaching of Reading in Training Colleges
1914: A Short History of English
1920: A History of Modern Colloquial English
1923: Studies in Rhymes
1923: Some Aspects of the Diction of English Poetry

References

Further reading

External links
 

1870 births
1945 deaths
People educated at Charterhouse School
Alumni of Corpus Christi College, Oxford
English lexicographers
Merton Professors of English Language and Literature
Fellows of Merton College, Oxford
English philologists